Seo In-taek (born 5 November 1962) is a South Korean sports shooter. He competed in the men's 50 metre free pistol event at the 1984 Summer Olympics.

References

1962 births
Living people
South Korean male sport shooters
Olympic shooters of South Korea
Shooters at the 1984 Summer Olympics
Place of birth missing (living people)
Shooters at the 1986 Asian Games
Asian Games medalists in shooting
Asian Games bronze medalists for South Korea
Medalists at the 1986 Asian Games
20th-century South Korean people
21st-century South Korean people